Two ships of the United States Navy have been named USS Ponchatoula or USNS Ponchatoula, after the Ponchatoula Creek in Louisiana.

  was a tanker commissioned in 1944.
  was a fleet oiler in service from 1956 to 1992.

United States Navy ship names